José Eugenio Vásquez de Jesús (born March 5, 1979 in Santo Domingo) is a judoka from the Dominican Republic, who competed in the men's heavyweight category. He picked up a total of fifteen medals in his career, including a bronze from the 2010 Central American and Caribbean Games in Mayagüez, Puerto Rico, attained a fifth-place finish in the 100-kg division at the 2003 Pan American Games in his native Santo Domingo, and represented his nation Dominican Republic in both 100 and over-100 kg class in two editions of the Olympic Games (2000 and 2004).

Career
Vasquez made his official debut at the 2000 Summer Olympics in Sydney, where he competed in the men's over-100 kg division. He lost his opening match to Kazakhstan's Vyacheslav Berduta, who immediately pushed him down the tatami using the small outer hook (kosoto gake) to produce an ippon victory inside 37 seconds.

At the 2004 Summer Olympics in Athens, Vasquez reduced his weight to 100 kg, and qualified for his second Dominican Republic squad in the men's half-heavyweight category, by granting an unused berth from the International Judo Federation and the Dominican Republic Olympic Committee. Vasquez could not improve his feat from the previous Games, as he conceded with a penalty and succumbed to an ippon and a tani otoshi (valley drop) from Finland's Timo Peltola before the five-minute regulation expired during their opening match.

References

External links

1979 births
Living people
Dominican Republic male judoka
Olympic judoka of the Dominican Republic
Judoka at the 2000 Summer Olympics
Judoka at the 2004 Summer Olympics
Judoka at the 2003 Pan American Games
Sportspeople from Santo Domingo
Central American and Caribbean Games bronze medalists for the Dominican Republic
Competitors at the 2010 Central American and Caribbean Games
Central American and Caribbean Games medalists in judo
Pan American Games competitors for the Dominican Republic
20th-century Dominican Republic people
21st-century Dominican Republic people